Everyday is the first live praise and worship album by Hillsong United. Following the success of the EP One, the album was recorded at the 1999 Hillsong Conference and released later that year. In 2000 the album was certified gold by Australian Recording Industry Association for shipment of 35000 units.

Reception 

In April 2000 Tim Roberts of Cross Rhythms rated the album as 10 out of 10 and felt it provided "quality songs, first class musicianship and an exemplary live recording, but above all it draws you into the presence of God".

Track listing
 "Everyday" (Joel Houston) - 03:43
 "Jesus I Long" (Marty Sampson) - 02:45
 "On The Lord's Day" (Reuben Morgan) - 05:40
 "More" (Morgan) - 04:43
 "Heaven" (Morgan) - 04:45
 "Seeking You" (Sampson) - 04:35
 "You Take Me Higher" (Raymond Badham) - 04:05
 "Hear Our Prayer" (Tanya Riches) - 06:10
 "Prayer To The King" (Sampson) - 06:14
 "God Is Moving" (Sampson) - 07:15

References 

Hillsong United albums
1999 live albums